Govardhana might refer to:

 Govardhana (poet) or Govardhanacharya, a 12th-century poet of Eastern India
 Govardhan, a town in Uttar Pradesh, India
 Govardhan Hill, a pilgrimage site in Uttar Pradesh, India

See also
Govardhan (disambiguation)